NGC 2950 is a lenticular galaxy in the northern constellation of Ursa Major, about 50 million light years from the Milky Way and receding with a heliocentric radial velocity of 1,329 km/s. It was discovered in 1790 by the Anglo-German astronomer William Herschel. NGC 2950 is a field galaxy, it is not part of a galaxy cluster or galaxy group, and thus is gravitationally isolated. Nine certain and four possible dwarf galaxies have been identified around NGC 2950.

The morphological classification of this galaxy is RSB0(r), indicating a barred lenticular galaxy (SB0) with outer (R) and inner (r) ring structures. It hosts two nested stellar bars; the rotation frequency of the secondary bar is higher than that of the primary one. Double bars of this type are relatively common, having been found in ~30% of barred lenticulars. The inner bar appears to be counter-rotating relative to the outer bar, with the two passing cleanly through each other.

References

External links 
 

Lenticular galaxies
Field galaxies
Ursa Major (constellation)
2950
27765
5176